Never Say Never Festival was an annual music festival which began March 18, 2009, in Mission, Texas. The festival featured bands of many different genres. The first Never Say Never festival hosted 30 bands on 2 stages, including Forever the Sickest Kids, Anarbor, NeverShoutNever!, A Skylit Drive, Drop Dead, Gorgeous, LMFAO and The Scene Aesthetic.

The 2010 and 2011 festivals followed on March 17, 2010 and March 15, 2011.

Naming The Festival 

The name "Never Say Never" was chosen by festival organizers Zar Castillo and George Culberson in response to all the people that told them that they would never be able to bring down incredible bands to South Texas.

2010 Festival

The 2010 festival was held on March 17, 2010. It hosted 40 bands of different genres on 3 stages. The festival featured a vendor village, that hosted shops like Monikapolitan.com and eleven apparel.

2016 Controversy and Demise 

The final Never Say Never Festival took place on March 16, 2016, at Las Palmas Racepark in Mission, TX. The festival was marred by technical issues, high-risk investments and low attendance which resulted in many of the artists having their set times cut short and not being paid in full for their performances.

In response to the controversy following the 2016 Never Say Never Festival, Matt Carter of Emery hosted an episode of his podcast "Break It Down with Matt Carter" with his bandmates. In a follow-up episode, Carter interviewed promoter Zar Castillo to clear the air and give Castillo a chance to share his side of the story and what reparations were being made to pay the bands who performed.

List of lineups by year

References 

Tourist attractions in Hidalgo County, Texas
Music festivals in Texas
Recurring events disestablished in 2009
2009 establishments in Texas